Til the Band Comes In is the sixth studio album by the American solo artist Scott Walker. It was released in December 1970 but failed to chart. Three singles were released from the album. The title track backed with "Jean the Machine" was released in the Netherlands. "Jean the Machine" and "Thanks For Chicago Mr. James" were each released in Japan. No singles were released in the UK. The release is a loose concept album about the inhabitants of a tenement.

Walker wrote the songs for the album quickly while on a working holiday in Greece in September 1970. The album was recorded late that same year between September and November 1970 with Walker's usual Philips studio team consisting of producer Johnny Franz, engineer Peter J. Olliff and Angela Morley and Peter Knight directing the musical arrangements. Receiving negative reviews the album was first released as an LP in December 1970. The album was removed and was not available for over twenty-five years. The album was later reassessed much more favourably and was eventually reissued in the UK on CD by BGO Records in August 1996, with new liner notes. This new edition fell out of print before a second CD re-issue followed in 2008 by the US label Water Records. The album was re-issued again on 3 June 2013 as part of a 5-CD set entitled Scott - The Collection 1967-1970.

The original liner notes were by Walker's then-manager Ady Semel with cover photography by Michael Joseph.

Recording and music
After the critical and commercial failure of Walker's previous album, Walker made several compromises with his manager and record company in an effort to restore his career momentum. The most apparent commercial decision was the singer's return to his stage name having chosen to be credited under his birth name, Scott Engel for the first time on his previous album Scott 4.

The album was split between the opening ten original compositions and five interpretations of middle-of-the-road standards and pop songs. Walker also took the unusual step of sharing his writing credits with his new manager Ady Semel. Walker summarised the collaboration with Semel: "He acts as my censor, vetting all my lyrics and striking out the words likely to harm old ladies". Walker also brought in Esther Ofarim, another singer managed by Semel, as a guest vocalist on "Long About Now".

The album marked the last time Walker would release any original material until The Walker Brothers' album Nite Flights in 1978.

Reception

At the time of release Til the Band Comes In received negative reviews by the majority of critics. Critical reception of the album has warmed considerably since Walker was critically reappraised in the decades following The Walker Brothers' 1978 album Nite Flights. The album is now classed as a worthy if somewhat compromised follow up to Walker's first four studio albums (not counting Walker's TV companion album; Scott: Scott Walker Sings Songs from his TV Series). Scott Plagenhoef writing for Pitchfork Media in 2008, describes Scott Walker's originals "[as] a step down from those on his previous two albums" but "worthwhile nonetheless".

Dave Thompson writing retrospectively for Allmusic was less charitable, calling "Thanks for Chicago Mr. James" and "Joe," "[the] album's sole concessions to such matters as reputation", and "while Walker's first four albums remain essential listening, and the TV LP at least has its moments, Til the Band Comes In is best left waiting at the stage door. Some "lost classics" were lost with good reason."

Britpop band Pulp implied that the second side of the album was significantly weaker than the first in the lyrics of their 2001 single "Bad Cover Version". Walker produced the song and its parent album We Love Life, although Pulp vocalist Jarvis Cocker states the song was written long before Walker became involved in the project. Cocker also said that he was nervous about singing the line in front of Walker, although states when it came to it Walker either did not notice or did not care.

Track listing

Personnel
 Scott Walker – vocals, main performer
 Esther Ofarim – vocals on "Long About Now"
 John Franz - Producer
 Angela Morley – Musical director (tracks 1 to 10)
 Peter Knight – Musical director (tracks 11 to 15)
 Peter Olliff - Sound Engineer
 Michael Joseph - Cover Photograph
 Ady Semel – original liner notes
 Alan Clayson – reissue liner notes

Release history

External links

References

1970 albums
Scott Walker (singer) albums
Philips Records albums
Albums produced by Johnny Franz